Leif Rantala (26 December 1947, Liljendal – 8 January 2015, Rovaniemi) was a Finnish-Swedish linguist, and a specialist of Sami languages, cultures of history, especially of the Kola Peninsula.

Valentina Sovkina characterized Rantala in Facebook with the following words: “He left a large, radiant footprint in the lives of the Sami people, with his interest in and knowledge of the Skolt Sami and the Sami of the Kola Peninsula.”

Activities in science and society
Rantala graduated from Helsinki University with a MA degree in Finno-Ugric languages in 1975. His thesis dealt with the Saami place names in Polmak. He worked at the University of Lapland in Rovaniemi, mainly as a teacher of the Northern Saami language. He was an expert of the Saami peoples and cultures of Pechenga and the Kola Peninsula. He collected a sizable collection of ethnographic materials from the Saami of Russia.

Rantala often had to work as a translator, when the civil servants in Finnish Lapland did not know Saami. “I have sometimes had to translate texts, when people have complained about the non-existent command of Saami of e.g. the police. How many Finnish civil servants have taken the trouble to learn Saami? I don’t think there are too many of them.” According to Rantala, society should use various perks to motivate civil servants to learn Saami.

Works

Translations

Work edited

References

Finnish Finno-Ugrists
Linguists of Sámi
1947 births
2015 deaths
Academic staff of the University of Lapland
University of Helsinki alumni
People from Loviisa
Finnish translators
20th-century Finnish people
20th-century linguists
20th-century translators
21st-century Finnish people
21st-century linguists
21st-century translators
Swedish-speaking Finns